This is a somewhat complete list of all Singapore Acts of Parliament which have been passed - the entire list of acts passed is available online at the Singapore Attorney-General's Chambers website, at Singapore Statutes. Approved Budgets and annual debates may be found at the Supply Act.

Acts by year

1869
Oaths of Office and Allegiance Act

1871
Penal Code

1872
Foreshores Act
Preservation of the Peace Act (repealed on 1 November 2000)

1875
Foreign Recruiting Act

1881
Fees Act

1886
Bills of Sale Act
Conveyancing and Law of Property Act

1893
Evidence Act

1898
Pawnbrokers Act

1901
Land Improvement Act (repealed on 1 April 1999)

1903
Coin Act (repealed on 1 September 2001)

1906
Miscellaneous Offences (Public Order and Nuisance) Act

1908
Petroleum Act (repealed on 16 February 2005)

1909
Apportionment of Rents Act
Civil Law Act

1913
Arms and Explosives Act

1915
Public Trustee Act

1921
Innkeepers Act
Maintenance Orders (Facilities for Enforcement) Act
Reciprocal Enforcement of Commonwealth Judgments Act

1922
Decorations and Uniforms Act
Premiums on Leases Act (repealed on 1 April 2001)

1923
Debtors Act
Local Treasury Bills Act

1924
Explosive Substances Act

1926
Boy Scouts Association Act
Land Officers Powers Act (repealed on 1 November 2000)

1928
Apportionment Act

1929
Estate Duty Act
Malaysia Revenue Vessels Act

1933
Prisons Act

1934
Distress Act
Guardianship of Infants Act
Legitimacy Act
Probate and Administration Act

1935
Official Secrets Act

1938
Poisons Act

1939
Adoption of Children Act
Prevention of Crimes Act (repealed on 1 November 2000)

1940
Land Revenue Collection Act

1941
Commissions of Inquiry Act (repealed on 1 November 2007)
Indecent Advertisements Act
Personal Injuries (Emergency Provisions) Act

1947
House to House and Street Collections Act
Hydrogen Cyanide (Fumigation) Act
Income Tax Act

1948
International Organisations (Immunities and Privileges) Act
Military Manoeuvres Act

1949
Bills of Exchange Act
National Emblems (Control of Display) Act

1950
Betting and Sweepstake Duties Act
Departmental Titles (Alteration) Act
Entertainments Duty Act
Price Control Act

1951
Consular Conventions Act (repealed on 1 May 2005)
Probation of Offenders Act

1952
Mental Disorders and Treatment Act
Private Lotteries Act (repealed on 1 April 2011)

1953
Central Provident Fund Act
Contributory Negligence and Personal Injuries Act
Control of Rent Act (repealed on 1 April 2001)
Local Forces (Relief of Financial Hardship) Act

1954
Hotels Act
Parliamentary Elections Act
Singapore Polytechnic Act

1955
Criminal Law (Temporary Provisions) Act
Medicines (Advertisement and Sale) Act

1956
Government Proceedings Act
Pensions Act
Public Service Commission Act

1957
Defamation Act
Diplomatic Privileges (Commonwealth Countries and Republic of Ireland) Act (repealed on 1 May 2005)
Education Act

1958
Employment Agencies Act
Police Force Act
Public Order (Preservation) Act (repealed on 16 May 2018)

1959
Banishment Act
Control of Manufacture Act
Development Fund Act
Frustrated Contracts Act
Housing and Development Act
Immigration Act
Limitation Act
Massage Establishments Act (repealed on 1 March 2018)
Minister for Finance (Incorporation) Act
Moneylenders Act
Notaries Public Act
Protected Areas and Protected Places Act (repealed on 18 December 2018)
Reciprocal Enforcement of Foreign Judgments Act

1960
Betting Act
Customs Act
Industrial Relations Act
Internal Security Act
Judicial Proceedings (Regulation of Reports) Act
Motor Vehicles (Third-Party Risks and Compensation) Act
Mutual Benefit Organisations Act
People’s Association Act
Prevention of Corruption Act
Property Tax Act

1961
Common Gaming Houses Act
Economic Development Board Act
High Court (Admiralty Jurisdiction) Act
Kidnapping Act
Women's Charter

1962
Parliament (Privileges, Immunities and Powers) Act

1964
Cattle Act
Emergency (Essential Powers) Act

1965
Animals and Birds Act
Feeding Stuffs Act
Housing Developers (Control and Licensing) Act
National Registration Act
Payroll Tax Act
Republic of Singapore Independence Act

1966
Administration of Muslim Law Act
Air Navigation Act
Asian Development Bank Act
Audit Act
Bretton Woods Agreements Act
Cinematograph Film Hire Duty Act
Corrosive and Explosive Substances and Offensive Weapons Act
Exchange Control Act
Financial Procedure Act
Free Trade Zones Act
Government Contracts Act
Inheritance (Family Provision) Act
Insurance Act
Land Acquisition Act
Loans (International Banks) Act

1967
Companies Act
Currency Act
Economic Expansion Incentives (Relief from Income Tax) Act
Finance Companies Act
Intestate Succession Act
Land Titles (Strata) Act
Ngee Ann Polytechnic Act
Undesirable Publications Act

1968
Arbitration (International Investment Disputes) Act
Diplomatic and Consular Officers (Oaths and Fees) Act
Employment Act
External Loans Act
Extradition Act
Institute of Southeast Asian Studies Act
International Finance Corporation Act
Jurong Town Corporation Act

1969
Controlled Premises (Special Provisions) Act (repealed on 31 March 2002)
Hire-Purchase Act

1970
Banking Act
Civil List and Pension Act
Enlistment Act 1970
Fisheries Act
Metrication Act
Monetary Authority of Singapore Act
National Servicemen (Employment) Act
Passports Act 
Preservation of Monuments Act

1971
Chit Funds Act
Post Office Savings Bank of Singapore Act (repealed on 21 May 1999)

1972
Carriage of Goods by Sea Act
Commercial and Industrial Security Corporation Act (repealed on 10 June 2005)
Dangerous Fireworks Act
Medical (Therapy, Education and Research) Act
National Cadet Corps Act

1973
Arms Offences Act
Buildings and Common Property (Maintenance and Management) Act (repealed on 1 April 2005)
Business Registration Act
Census Act
Control of Essential Supplies Act
Factories Act
Geneva Conventions Act
Misuse of Drugs Act
Multi-Level Marketing and Pyramid Selling (Prohibition) Act
Private Investigation and Security Agencies Act
Public Entertainments and Meetings Act

1974
Electrical Workers and Contractors Licensing Act (repealed on 1 December 2002)
Martial Arts Instruction Act (repealed on 22 December 2003)
National Police Cadet Corps Act
Newspaper and Printing Presses Act
Parking Places Act
Planning (Cancellation of Permission) Act (repealed on 8 December 2000)
Property Tax (Surcharge) Act

1975
Consumer Protection (Trade Descriptions and Safety Requirements) Act
Maintenance Orders (Reciprocal Enforcement) Act
Medicines Act
Parking Places (Surcharge) Act
Parks and Trees Act (repealed on 1 August 2005)

1976
Infectious Diseases Act 1976
Pensions (Expatriate Officers) Act

1978
Hijacking of Aircraft and Protection of Aircraft and International Airports Act
Parliamentary Pensions Act

1979
Co-operative Societies Act
Evidence (Civil Proceedings in Other Jurisdictions) Act
Money-changing and Remittance Businesses Act
Pharmacists Registration Act
Sale of Commercial Properties Act

1980
Criminal Procedure Code
National University of Singapore Act
Private Hospitals and Medical Clinics Act

1981
Films Act 1981
Legal Profession Act

1982
International Enterprise Singapore Board Act

1983
Development Loan Act

1984
Civil Aviation Authority of Singapore Act
HUDC Housing Estates Act

1985
Appraisers and House Agents Act

1986
Civil Defence Act
Futures Trading Act (repealed on 1 October 2002)

1987
Accountants Act (repealed on 1 April 2004)
Copyright Act
Development Loan (1987) Act
Environmental Public Health Act
Human Organ Transplant Act
Intoxicating Substances Act
Public Service (Variation of 1984 Annual Wage Increases) Act 1987
Public Transport Council Act

1988
Child Care Centres Act (repealed on 2 January 2019)
Homes for the Aged Act
Mass Rapid Transit Corporation Act (repealed on 1 September 1995)
Public Service (Monthly Variable Component and Non-pensionable Annual Allowance) Act

1989
Building Control Act
Corruption (Confiscation of Benefits) Act (repealed on 13 September 1999)
Destitute Persons Act
Endangered Species (Import and Export) Act

1990
National Science and Technology Board Act 1990 (renamed to Agency for Science, Technology and Research Act in 2002)
Employment of Foreign Workers Act
Maintenance of Religious Harmony Act
Planning Act
Prevention of Pollution of the Sea Act
Temasek Polytechnic Act

1991
Architects Act
Land Surveyors Act
Nanyang Technological University Act
National Arts Council Act
Presidential Elections Act
Professional Engineers Act
Radiation Protection Act 1991

1992
Commodity Trading Act
Drug Trafficking (Confiscation of Benefits) Act (repealed and renamed as the Corruption, Drug Trafficking and Other Serious Crimes (Confiscation of Benefits) Act)
Education Endowment Scheme Act
Government Securities Act
Inland Revenue Authority of Singapore Act
Institute of Technical Education Act
Nanyang Polytechnic Act
National Council of Social Service Act
National Productivity Board Act (repealed on 1 April 1996)

1993
Application of English Law Act
Children and Young Persons Act 1993
Computer Misuse Act 1993
Control of Plants Act
Fire Safety Act 1993
Goods and Services Tax Act 1993
Land Titles Act 1993
National Heritage Board Act 1993

1994
Broadcasting Act
Charities Act 1994
International Arbitration Act
Judges’ Remuneration Act
Patents Act

1995
Bankruptcy Act
Contact Lens Practitioners Act
Land Transport Authority of Singapore Act
Legal Aid and Advice Act
Maintenance of Parents Act
Merchant Shipping Act
National Library Board Act
Pension Fund Act
Rapid Transit Systems Act

1996
Advance Medical Directive Act
Countervailing and Anti-Dumping Duties Act
Executive Condominium Housing Scheme Act
Institute of Education (Repeal) Act 1996
Maritime and Port Authority of Singapore Act
National Parks Act

1997
Civil Defence Shelter Act
Community Mediation Centres Act
Government Procurement Act
Hazardous Waste (Control of Export, Import and Transit) Act

1998
Boundaries and Survey Maps Act
Computer Misuse (Amendment) Act 1998
Control of Vectors and Pesticides Act
Electronic Transactions Act
Films (Amendment) Act 1998
Geographical Indications Act
Holidays Act
Merchant Shipping (Civil Liability and Compensation for Oil Pollution) Act
Post Office Savings Bank of Singapore (Transfer of Undertakings and Dissolution) Act
Princess Elizabeth Fund (Repeal) Act 1998
Trade Marks Act 1998

1999
Building and Construction Authority Act
Corruption, Drug Trafficking and Other Serious Crimes (Confiscation of Benefits) Act
Dentists Act
Environmental Pollution Control Act
Exchanges (Demutualisation and Merger) Act
Final Supply (FY1998) Act 1999
Infectious Diseases (Amendment) Act 1999
Info-communications Development Authority of Singapore Act
Insurance Intermediaries Act
Layout-Designs of Integrated Circuits Act
Nurses and Midwives Act
Postal Services Act
Sewerage and Drainage Act
Telecommunications Act 1999

2000
Agri-Food and Veterinary Authority Act (repealed on 1 April 2019)
Chemical Weapons (Prohibition) Act
Compulsory Education Act
Defence Science and Technology Agency Act
Developmental Investment Fund Act
Medical and Elderly Care Endowment Schemes Act
Mutual Assistance in Criminal Matters Act
National Science and Technology Board (Amendment) Act 2000
Oaths and Declarations Act 2000
Political Donations Act
Prisons (Amendment) Act 2000
Registered Designs Act
Singapore Management University Act 2000
Traditional Chinese Medicine Practitioners Act 2000

2001
Arbitration Act
Banking (Amendment) Act 2001
Children Development Co-Savings Act
Civil Service College Act
Contracts (Rights of Third Parties) Act
Control of Rent (Abolition) Act 2001
District Cooling Act
Education Service Incentive Payment Act
Electricity Act
Energy Market Authority of Singapore Act
Financial Advisers Act
Gas Act
Health Promotion Board Act
Health Sciences Authority Act
Home Affairs Uniformed Services Superannuation Act
Insurance (Amendment) Act 2001
Intellectual Property Office of Singapore Act
Lifelong Learning Endowment Fund Act 2001
Parliamentary Elections (Amendment) Act 2001
Parliamentary Elections (Amendment No. 2) Act 2001
Parliamentary Elections (Temporary Suspension of Overseas Voting) Act 2001
Public Utilities Act
Securities and Futures Act
Singapore Business Federation Act
United Nations Act

2002
Final Supply (FY 2001) Act 2002
Goods and Services Tax (Amendment) Act 2002
International Development Association Act
Media Development Authority of Singapore Act
National Environment Agency Act
National Science and Technology Board (Amendment) Act 2002
Payment and Settlement Systems (Finality and Netting) Act
Republic Polytechnic Act
Singapore Productivity and Standards Board (Amendment) Act 2002
Terrorism (Suppression of Financing) Act

2003
Computer Misuse (Amendment) Act 2003
Consumer Protection (Fair Trading) Act
Infectious Diseases (Amendment) Act 2003
Infectious Diseases (Amendment No. 2) Act 2003
Maritime Offences Act
Martial Arts Instruction (Repeal) Act 2003
Singapore Examinations and Assessment Board Act
Singapore Workforce Development Agency Act 2003

2004
Accountants Act 2004
Accounting and Corporate Regulatory Authority Act 2004
Building and Construction Industry Security of Payment Act 2004
Building Maintenance and Strata Management Act 2004
Business Trusts Act 2004
Competition Act 2004
Copyright (Amendment) Act 2004
Human Cloning and Other Prohibited Practices Act 2004
Manufacture of Optical Discs Act 2004
Plant Varieties Protection Act 2004
Police Force Act 2004
Supply Act 2004

2005
Administration of Muslim Law (Amendment) Act 2005
Appraisers and House Agents (Amendment) Act 2005
Architects (Amendment) Act 2005
Betting and Sweepstake Duties (Amendment) Act 2005
Biological Agents and Toxins Act 2005
Central Provident Fund (Amendment) Act 2005
CISCO (Dissolution) Act 2005
Community Care Endowment Fund Act 2005
Companies (Amendment) Act 2005
Competition (Amendment) Act 2005
Copyright (Amendment) Act 2005
Deposit Insurance Act 2005
Diplomatic and Consular Relations Act 2005
Education Endowment Scheme (Amendment) Act 2005
Financial Advisers (Amendment) Act 2005
Goods and Services Tax (Amendment) Act 2005
Housing and Development (Amendment) Act 2005
Income Tax (Amendment) Act 2005
Inland Revenue Authority of Singapore (Amendment) Act 2005
Moneylenders (Amendment) Act 2005
Legal Profession (Amendment) Act 2005
Limited Liability Partnerships Act 2005
Money-changing and Remittance Businesses (Amendment) Act 2005
Nanyang Technological University (Corporatisation) Act 2005
National University of Singapore (Corporatisation) Act 2005
Nurses and Midwives (Amendment) Act 2005
Parking Places (Amendment) Act 2005
Parks and Trees Act 2005
Parliamentary Elections (Amendment) Act 2005
Presidential Elections (Amendment) Act 2005
Professional Engineers (Amendment) Act 2005
Public Transport Council (Amendment) Act 2005
Registration of Criminals (Amendment) Act 2005
Securities and Futures (Amendment) Act 2005
Singapore Management University (Amendment) Act 2005
Small Claims Tribunals (Amendment) Act 2005
Stamp Duties (Amendment) Act 2005
Stamp Duties (Amendment No. 2) Act 2005
Statutes (Miscellaneous Amendments and Repeal) Act 2005
Statutes (Miscellaneous Amendments) (No. 2) Act 2005
Subordinate Courts (Amendment) Act 2005
Supplementary Supply (FY 2004) Act 2005
Supply Act 2005
Telecommunications (Amendment) Act 2005
Town Councils (Amendment) Act 2005
Trust Companies Act 2005
Weights and Measures (Amendment) Act 2005

2006
Accountants (Amendment) Act 2006
Casino Control Act 2006
Central Provident Fund (Amendment) Act 2006
Electricity (Amendment) Act 2006
Endangered Species (Import and Export) Act 2006
Enlistment (Amendment) Act 2006
Intoxicating Substances (Amendment) Act 2006
Misuse of Drugs (Amendment) Act 2006
Moneylenders (Amendment) Act 2006
Mutual Assistance in Criminal Matters (Amendment) Act 2006
National Research Fund Act 2006
Payment Systems (Oversight) Act 2006
Private Lotteries (Amendment) Act 2006
Residential Property (Amendment) Act 2006
Road Traffic (Amendment) Act 2006
Singapore Armed Forces (Amendment) Act 2006
Supplementary Supply (FY2005) Act 2006
Supply Act 2006
Workplace Safety and Health Act 2006

2007
Accounting Standards Act 2007
Agency for Science, Technology and Research (Amendment) Act 2007
Air Navigation (Amendment) Act 2007
Arms and Explosives (Amendment) Act 2007
Banking (Amendment) Act 2007
Building Control (Amendment) Act 2007
Carriage by Air (Montreal Convention, 1999) Act 2007
Central Provident Fund (Amendment) Act 2007
Central Provident Fund (Amendment No. 2) Act 2007
Charities (Amendment) Act 2007
Chemical Weapons (Prohibition) (Amendment) Act 2007
Children Development Co-Savings (Amendment) Act 2007
Civil Aviation Authority of Singapore (Amendment) Act 2007
Commodity Trading (Amendment) Act 2007
Competition (Amendment) Act 2007
Constitution of the Republic of Singapore (Amendment) Act 2007
Corruption, Drug Trafficking and Other Serious Crimes (Confiscation of Benefits) (Amendment) Act 2007
Dentists (Amendment) Act 2007
Economic Expansion Incentives (Relief from Income Tax) (Amendment) Act 2007
Education Endowment Scheme (Amendment) Act 2007
Education Endowment Scheme (Amendment No. 2) Act 2007
Employment of Foreign Workers (Amendment) Act 2007
Environmental Pollution Control (Amendment) Act 2007
Financial Procedure (Amendment) Act 2007
Gas (Amendment) Act 2007
Geneva Conventions (Amendment) Act 2007
Goods and Services Tax (Amendment) Act 2007
Health Products Act 2007
Income Tax (Amendment) Act 2007
Income Tax (Amendment No. 2) Act 2007
Inquiries Act 2007
Land Acquisition (Amendment) Act 2007
Land Titles (Strata) (Amendment) Act 2007
Land Transport Authority of Singapore (Amendment) Act 2007
Legal Profession (Amendment) Act 2007
Monetary Authority of Singapore (Amendment) Act 2007
Monetary Authority of Singapore (Amendment No. 2) Act 2007
National Registry of Diseases Act 2007
Ngee Ann Kongsi (Incorporation) (Amendment) Act 2007
Optometrists and Opticians Act 2007
Passports Act 2007
Penal Code (Amendment) Act 2007
Pharmacists Registration Act 2007
Postal Services (Amendment) Act 2007
Private Security Industry Act 2007
Property Tax (Surcharge) (Abolition) Act 2007
Public Service Commission (Amendment) Act 2007
Radiation Protection Act 2007
Secondhand Goods Dealers Act 2007
Singapore Armed Forces (Amendment) Act 2007
Spam Control Act 2007
Statutes (Miscellaneous Amendments) Act 2007
Strategic Goods (Control) (Amendment) Act 2007
Supplementary Supply (FY 2006) Act 2007
Supply Act 2007
Terrorism (Suppression of Bombings) Act 2007
Trade Marks (Amendment) Act 2007

2008
Administration of Muslim Law (Amendment) Act 2008
Central Provident Fund (Amendment) Act 2008
Children Development Co-Savings (Amendment) Act 2008
Consumer Protection (Fair Trading) (Amendment) Act 2008
Constitution of the Republic of Singapore (Amendment) Act 2008
Co-operative Societies (Amendment) Act 2008
Customs (Amendment) Act 2008
Economic Development Board (Amendment) Act 2008
Employment (Amendment) Act 2008
Environmental Public Health (Amendment) Act 2008
Estate Duty (Abolition) Act 2008
Financial Advisers (Amendment) Act 2008
Goods and Services Tax (Amendment) Act 2008
Housing and Development (Amendment) Act 2008
Human Organ Transplant (Amendment) Act 2008
Income Tax (Amendment) Act 2008
Infectious Diseases (Amendment) Act 2008
Internationally Protected Persons Act 2008
Legal Profession (Amendment) Act 2008
Limited Partnerships Act 2008
Mental Capacity Act 2008
Mental Health (Care and Treatment) Act 2008
Merchant Shipping (Civil Liability and Compensation for Bunker Oil Pollution) Act 2008
Moneylenders Act 2008
Parliamentary Elections (Amendment) Act 2008
Patents (Amendment) Act 2008
Property Tax (Amendment) Act 2008
Public Transport Council (Amendment) Act 2008
Securities and Futures (Amendment) Act 2008
Singapore Totalisator Board (Amendment) Act 2008
Singapore Tourism (Cess Collection) (Amendment) Act 2008
Skills Development Levy (Amendment) Act 2008
Stamp Duties (Amendment) Act 2008
Statutes (Miscellaneous Amendments) Act 2008
Statutes (Miscellaneous Amendments) (No. 2) Act 2008
Supplementary Supply (FY 2007) Act 2008
Supply Act 2008
Workmen's Compensation (Amendment) Act 2008
Workplace Safety and Health (Amendment) Act 2008

2009
Bankruptcy (Amendment) Act 2009
Building and Construction Authority (Amendment) Act 2009
Business Registration (Amendment) Act 2009
Casino Control (Amendment) Act 2009
Central Provident Fund (Amendment) Act 2009
Civil Aviation Authority of Singapore Act 2009
Civil Law (Amendment) Act 2009
Copyright (Amendment) Act 2009
Criminal Law (Temporary Provisions) (Amendment) Act 2009
Goods and Services Tax (Amendment) Act 2009
Human Organ Transplant (Amendment) Act 2009
Films (Amendment) Act 2009
Income Tax (Amendment) Act 2009
Income Tax (Amendment) (Exchange of Information) Act 2009
Insurance (Amendment) Act 2009
International Arbitration (Amendment) Act 2009
International Interests in Aircraft Equipment Act 2009
Legal Profession (Amendment) Act 2009
Preservation of Monuments Act 2009
Private Education Act 2009
Public Order Act 2009
Quorums of Statutory Boards (Miscellaneous Amendments) Act 2009
Singapore Armed Forces (Amendment) Act 2009
State Lands (Amendment) Act 2009
Supplementary Supply (FY 2008) Act 2009
Supply Act 2009

2010
Central Provident Fund (Amendment) Act 2010
Charities (Amendment) Act 2010
Civil Defence (Amendment) Act 2010
Constitution of the Republic of Singapore (Amendment) Act 2010
Coroners Act 2010
Criminal Procedure Code 2010
Economic Expansion Incentives (Relief from Income Tax) (Amendment) Act 2010
Electronic Transactions Act 2010
Estate Agents Act 2010
Goods and Services Tax (Amendment) Act 2010
Government Securities (Amendment) Act 2010
Hindu Endowments (Amendment) Act 2010
Hostage Taking Act 2010
Housing and Development (Amendment) Act 2010
Income Tax (Amendment) Act 2010
Industrial Relations (Amendment) Act 2010
International Child Abduction Act 2010
Land Titles (Strata) (Amendment) Act 2010
Maintenance of Parents (Amendment) Act 2010
Medical Registration (Amendment) Act 2010
Moneylenders (Amendment) Act 2010
National Productivity Fund Act 2010
Parliamentary Elections (Amendment) Act 2010
Presidential Elections (Amendment) Act 2010
Property Tax (Amendment) Act 2010
Rapid Transit Systems (Amendment) Act 2010
Residential Property (Amendment) Act 2010
Road Traffic (Amendment) Act 2010
Smoking (Control of Advertisements and Sale of Tobacco) (Amendment) Act 2010
Stamp Duties (Amendment) Act 2010
Stamp Duties (Amendment No. 2) Act 2010
Statistics (Amendment) Act 2010
Statutes (Miscellaneous Amendments) Act 2010
Subordinate Courts (Amendment) Act 2010
Supplementary Supply (FY 2009) Act 2010
Supply Act 2010
Supreme Court of Judicature (Amendment) Act 2010

2011
Allied Health Professions Act 2011
Amusement Rides Safety Act 2011
Central Provident Fund (Amendment) Act 2011
Children and Young Persons (Amendment) Act 2011
Children Development Co-Savings (Amendment) Act 2011
Conveyancing (Miscellaneous Amendments) Act 2011
Customs (Amendment) Act 2011
Deposit Insurance and Policy Owners' Protection Schemes Act 2011
Employment Agencies (Amendment) Act 2011
Environmental Protection and Management (Amendment) Act 2011
Income Tax (Amendment) Act 2011
Insurance (Amendment) Act 2011
Goods and Services Tax (Amendment) Act 2011
Legal Profession (Amendment) Act 2011
Private Lotteries Act 2011
Retirement Age (Amendment) Act 2011
Singapore University of Technology and Design Act 2011
Stamp Duties (Amendment) Act 2011
Supplementary Supply (FY 2010) Act 2011
Supply Act 2011
Telecommunications (Amendment) Act 2011
United Nations Personnel Act 2011
Women's Charter (Amendment) Act 2011
Work Injury Compensation (Amendment) Act 2011
Workplace Safety and Health (Amendment) Act 2011

2012
Building Control (Amendment) Act 2012
Casino Control (Amendment) Act 2012
Central Provident Fund (Amendment) Act 2012
Civil Law (Amendment) Act 2012
Civil List and Pension (Amendment) Act 2012
Consumer Protection (Fair Trading) Amendment) Act 2012
Criminal Procedure Code (Amendment) Act 2012
Economic Expansion Incentives (Relief from Income Tax) (Amendment) Act 2012
Employment of Foreign Manpower (Amendment) Act 2012
Energy Conservation Act 2012
Evidence (Amendment) Act 2012
Financial Advisers (Amendment) Act 2012
Foreign Limitation Periods Act 2012
Goods and Services Tax (Amendment) Act 2012
Goods and Services Tax Voucher Fund Act 2012
HUDC Housing Estates (Amendment) Act 2012
Immigration (Amendment) Act 2012
Income Tax (Amendment) Act 2012
Intellectual Property (Miscellaneous Amendments) Act 2012
International Arbitration (Amendment) Act 2012
Land Transport Authority of Singapore (Amendment) Act 2012
Legal Profession (Amendment) Act 2012
Misuse of Drugs (Amendment) Act 2012
Moneylenders (Amendment) Act 2012
Parliamentary Pensions (Abolition) Act 2012
Patents (Amendment) Act 2012
Penal Code (Amendment) Act 2012
Personal Data Protection Act 2012
Public Utilities (Amendment) Act 2012
Road Traffic (Amendment) Act 2012
Securities and Futures (Amendment) Act 2012
Sewerage and Drainage (Amendment) Act 2012
Statutes (Miscellaneous Amendments) Act 2012
Statutes (Miscellaneous Amendments) (No. 2) Act 2012
Supplementary Supply (FY2011) Act 2012
Supply Act 2012
Voluntary Sterilization (Amendment) Act 2012

2013
Central Provident Fund (Amendment) Act 2013
Child Development Co-Savings (Amendment) Act 2013
Computer Misuse (Amendment) Act 2013
Criminal Law (Temporary Provisions) (Amendment) Act 2013
Economic Expansion Incentives (Relief from Income Tax) (Amendment) Act 2013
Employment, Parental Leave and Other Measures Act 2013
Financial Holding Companies Act 2013
Financial Institutions (Miscellaneous Amendments) Act 2013
Fire Safety (Amendment) Act 2013
Goods and Services Tax (Amendment) Act 2013
Housing Developers (Control and Licensing) (Amendment) Act 2013
Income Tax (Amendment) Act 2013
Insurance (Amendment) Act 2013
Jurong Town Corporation (Amendment) Act 2013
Legal Aid and Advice (Amendment) Act 2013
Monetary Authority of Singapore (Amendment) Act 2013
Motor Vehicles (Third-Party Risks and Compensation) (Amendment) Act 2013
Payment Systems (Oversight) (Amendment) Act 2013
Property Tax (Amendment) Act 2013
Road Traffic (Amendment) Act 2013
Singapore Accountancy Commission Act 2013
Stamp Duties (Amendment) Act 2013
Status of Children (Assisted Reproduction Technology) Act 2013
Supplementary Supply (FY 2012) Act 2013
Supply Act 2013
Terrorism (Suppression of Financing) (Amendment) Act 2013

2014
Accounting and Corporate Regulatory Authority (Amendment) Act 2014
Air Navigation (Amendment) Act 2014
Animals and Birds (Amendment) Act 2014
Attorney-General (Additional Functions) Act 2014
Business Names Registration Act 2014
Companies (Amendment) Act 2014
Constitution of the Republic of Singapore (Amendment) Act 2014
Copyright (Amendment) Act 2014
Corruption, Drug Trafficking and Other Serious Crimes (Confiscation of Benefits) (Amendment) Act 2014
Education Endowment and Savings Schemes (Amendment) Act 2014
Environmental Public Health (Amendment) Act 2014
Family Justice Act 2014
Geographical Indications Act 2014
Goods and Services Tax (Amendment) Act 2014
Government Procurement (Amendment) Act 2014
Income Tax (Amendment) Act 2014
Judges' Remuneration (Amendment) Act 2014
Land Acquisition (Amendment) Act 2014
Land Titles (Amendment) Act 2014
Legal Profession (Amendment) Act 2014
Merchant Shipping (Maritime Labour Convention) Act 2014
Mutual Assistance in Criminal Matters (Amendment) Act 2014
Pioneer Generation Fund Act 2014
Plant Varieties Protection (Amendment) Act 2014
Prevention of Human Trafficking Act 2014
Prisons (Amendment) Act 2014
Protection from Harassment Act 2014
Public Entertainments and Meetings (Amendment) Act 2014
Public Order (Additional Temporary Measures) Act 2014
Public Trustee (Amendment) Act 2014
Radiation Protection (Amendment) Act 2014
Rapid Transit Systems (Amendment) Act 2014
Regulation of Imports and Exports (Amendment) Act 2014
Remote Gambling Act 2014
Road Traffic (Amendment) Act 2014
Singapore Institute of Technology Act 2014
Singapore Tourism Board (Amendment) Act 2014
Stamp Duties (Amendment) Act 2014
Statutes (Miscellaneous Amendments) Act 2014
Statutes (Miscellaneous Amendments) (No. 2) Act 2014
Statutes (Miscellaneous Amendments – Deputy Attorney-General) Act 2014
Subordinate Courts (Amendment) Act 2014
Supplementary Supply (FY 2013) Act 2014
Supply Act 2014
Supreme Court of Judicature (Amendment) Act 2014
Transboundary Haze Pollution Act 2014

2015
Asian Infrastructure Investment Bank Act 2015
Bankruptcy (Amendment) Act 2015
Bus Services Industry Act 2015
Civil Aviation Authority of Singapore (Amendment) Act 2015
Community Disputes Resolution Act 2015
Constitution of the Republic of Singapore (Amendment) Act 2015
Deep Seabed Mining Act 2015
Employment (Amendment) Act 2015
Financial Advisers (Amendment) Act 2015
Foreign Employee Dormitories Act 2015
Government Securities (Amendment) Act 2015
Housing and Development (Amendment) Act 2015
Human Biomedical Research Act 2015
Industrial Relations (Amendment) Act 2015
Institute of Southeast Asian Studies (Amendment) Act 2015
Insurance (Amendment) Act 2015
Land Acquisition (Amendment) Act 2015
Liquor Control (Supply and Consumption) Act 2015
Maritime Offences (Amendment) Act 2015
MediShield Life Scheme Act 2015
Monetary Authority of Singapore (Amendment) Act 2015
Organised Crime Act 2015
Pawnbrokers Act 2015
Police Force (Amendment) Act 2015
Public Transport Council (Amendment) Act 2015
Silver Support Scheme Act 2015
State Lands (Amendment) Act 2015
Supplementary Supply (FY 2014) Act 2015
Supply Act 2015
Third-Party Taxi Booking Service Providers Act 2015
Unmanned Aircraft (Public Safety and Security) Act 2015

2016
Administration of Justice (Protection) Act 2016
Banking (Amendment) Act 2016
Bretton Woods Agreements (Amendment) Act 2016
Central Provident Fund (Amendment) Act 2016
Central Provident Fund (Amendment No. 2) Act 2016
Child Development Co-Savings (Amendment) Act 2016
Child Development Co-Savings (Amendment No. 2) Act 2016
Choice of Court Agreements Act 2016
Constitution of the Republic of Singapore (Amendment) Act 2016
Consumer Protection (Fair Trading) (Amendment) Act 2016
Credit Bureau Act 2016
Economic Expansion Incentives (Relief from Income Tax) (Amendment) Act 2016
Employment Claims Act 2016
Final Supply (FY 2015) Act 2016
Fire Safety (Amendment) Act 2016
Goods and Services Tax (Amendment) Act 2016
Government Technology Agency Act 2016
Income Tax (Amendment) Act 2016
Income Tax (Amendment No. 2) Act 2016
Income Tax (Amendment No. 3) Act 2016
Info-communications Media Development Authority Act 2016
Mental Capacity (Amendment) Act 2016
Merchant Shipping (Maritime Labour Convention) (Amendment) Act 2016
National Environment Agency (Miscellaneous Amendments) Act 2016
National Registration (Amendment) Act 2016
Pioneer Generation Fund (Amendment) Act 2016
Registration of Criminals (Amendment) Act 2016
Singapore Workforce Development Agency (Amendment) Act 2016
SkillsFuture Singapore Agency Act 2016
Statutes (Miscellaneous Amendments) Act 2016
Supply Act 2016
Telecommunications (Amendment) Act 2016
Tobacco (Control of Advertisements and Sale) (Amendment) Act 2016
Women's Charter (Amendment) Act 2016

2017
Active Mobility Act 2017
Administration of Muslim Law (Amendment) Act 2017
Architects (Amendment) Act 2017
Audit (Amendment) Act 2017
Building Maintenance and Strata Management (Amendment) Act 2017
Central Provident Fund (Amendment) Act 2017
Civil Law (Amendment) Act 2017
Companies (Amendment) Act 2017
Computer Misuse and Cybersecurity Act (Amendment) 2017
Early Childhood Development Centres Act 2017
Energy Conservation (Amendment) Act 2017
Goods and Services Tax (Amendment) Act 2017
Home Team Corps Act 2017
Income Tax (Amendment) Act 2017
Infrastructure Protection Act 2017
International Enterprise Singapore Board (Amendment) Act 2017
Jurong Town Corporation (Amendment) Act 2017
Limited Liability Partnerships (Amendment) Act 2017
Maritime and Port Authority of Singapore (Amendment) Act 2017
Massage Establishments Act 2017
Mediation Act 2017
Merchant Shipping (Wreck Removal) Act 2017
Monetary Authority of Singapore (Amendment) Act 2017
Parks and Trees (Amendment) Act 2017
Patents (Amendment) Act 2017
Planning (Amendment) Act 2017
Presidential Elections (Amendment) Act 2017
Prevention of Pollution of the Sea (Amendment) Act 2017
Professional Engineers (Amendment) Act 2017
Property Tax (Amendment) Act 2017
Public Entertainments and Meetings (Amendment) Act 2017
Public Order (Amendment) Act 2017
Road Traffic (Amendment) Act 2017
Registered Designs (Amendment) Act 2017
Retirement and Re-employment (Amendment) Act 2017
Sale of Food (Amendment) Act 2017
Securities and Futures (Amendment) Act 2017
Singapore University of Social Sciences Act 2017
Stamp Duties (Amendment) Act 2017
Supplementary Supply (FY 2016) Act 2017
Supply Act 2017
Terrorism (Suppression of Misuse of Radioactive Material) Act 2017
The Kwong-Wai-Shiu Free Hospital (Transfer of Undertaking and Dissolution) Act 2017
Tobacco (Control of Advertisements and Sale) (Amendment) Act 2017
Town Councils (Amendment) Act 2017
Travel Agents (Amendment) Act 2017
Trustees (Amendment) Act 2017
Workplace Safety and Health (Amendment) Act 2017

2018
Aviation (Miscellaneous Amendments) Act 2018
Building and Construction Industry Security of Payment (Amendment) Act 2018
Carbon Pricing Act 2018
Charities (Amendment) Act 2018
Civil Defence and Other Matters Act 2018
Common Services Tunnels Act 2018
Companies (Amendment) Act 2018
Competition (Amendment) Act 2018
Co-operative Societies (Amendment) Act 2018
Criminal Justice Reform Act 2018
Criminal Law (Temporary Provisions) (Amendment) Act 2018
Cross-Border Railways Act 2018
Customs (Amendment) Act 2018
Cybersecurity Act 2018
Deposit Insurance and Policy Owners' Protection Schemes (Amendment) Act 2018
Developers (Anti-Money Laundering and Terrorism Financing) Act 2018
Economic Expansion Incentives (Relief from Income Tax) (Amendment) Act 2018
Electricity (Amendment) Act 2018
Employment (Amendment) Act 2018
Enterprise Singapore Board Act 2018
Environmental Public Health (Amendment) Act 2018
Evidence (Amendment) Act 2018
Films (Amendment) Act 2018
Gas (Amendment) Act 2018
Goods and Services Tax (Amendment) Act 2018
Immigration (Amendment) Act 2018
Income Tax (Amendment) Act 2018
Insolvency, Restructuring and Dissolution Act 2018
Intellectual Property (Border Enforcement) Act 2018
Land Transport Authority of Singapore (Amendment) Act 2018
Land Transport (Enforcement Measures) Act 2018
Legal Aid and Advice (Amendment) Act 2018
Legal Profession (Amendment) Act 2018
Moneylenders (Amendment) Act 2018
National Library Board (Amendment) Act 2018
Parking Places (Amendment) Act 2018
Parliamentary Elections (Amendment) Act 2018
Payment and Settlement Systems (Finality and Netting) (Amendment) Act 2018
Public Order and Safety (Special Powers) Act 2018
Public Sector (Governance) Act 2018
Public Utilities (Amendment) Act 2018
Regulation of Imports and Exports (Amendment) Act 2018
Serious Crimes and Counter-Terrorism (Miscellaneous Amendments) Act 2018
Singapore Tourism (Cess Collection) (Amendment) Act 2018
Small Claims Tribunals (Amendment) Act 2018
Smoking (Prohibition in Certain Places) (Amendment) Act 2018
Stamp Duties (Amendment) Act 2018
Supplementary Supply (FY 2017) Act 2018
Supply Act 2018
Supreme Court of Judicature (Amendment) Act 2018
Supreme Court of Judicature (Amendment No. 2) Act 2018
Tokyo Convention (Amendment) Act 2018
Transport Safety Investigations Act 2018
Variable Capital Companies Act 2018
Vulnerable Adults Act 2018

2019
Air Navigation (Amendment) Act 2019
CareShield Life and Long-Term Care Act 2019
Central Provident Fund (Amendment) Act 2019
Chemical Weapons (Prohibition) (Amendment) Act 2019
Children and Young Persons (Amendment) Act 2019
Constitution of the Republic of Singapore (Amendment) Act 2019
Criminal Law Reform Act 2019
Criminal Procedure Code (Amendment) Act 2019
Currency (Amendment) Act 2019
Fire Safety (Amendment) Act 2019
Goods and Services Tax (Amendment) Act 2019
Home Team Science and Technology Agency Act 2019
Home Affairs Uniformed Services Superannuation (Amendment) Act 2019
Income Tax (Amendment) Act 2019
Infectious Diseases (Amendment) Act 2019
Intellectual Property (Dispute Resolution) Act 2019
Judges' Remuneration (Amendment) Act 2019
Maintenance of Religious Harmony (Amendment) Act 2019
Merchant Shipping (Miscellaneous Amendments) Act 2019
Misuse of Drugs (Amendment) Act 2019
National Parks Board (Amendment) Act 2019
Payment Services Act 2019
Pioneer Generation Fund (Amendment) Act 2019
Point-to-Point Passenger Transport Industry Act 2019
Precious Stones and Precious Metals (Prevention of Money Laundering and Terrorism Financing) Act 2019
Protection from Harassment (Amendment) Act 2019
Protection from Online Falsehoods and Manipulation Act 2019
Reciprocal Enforcement of Commonwealth Judgments (Repeal) Act 2019
Reciprocal Enforcement of Foreign Judgments (Amendment) Act 2019
Resource Sustainability Act 2019
Road Traffic (Amendment) Act 2019
Singapore Food Agency Act 2019
Supplementary Supply (FY 2018) Act 2019
Supply Act 2019
Supreme Court of Judicature (Amendment) Act 2019
Tobacco (Control of Advertisements and Sale) (Amendment) Act 2019
Traditional Chinese Medicine Practitioners (Amendment) Act 2019
Variable Capital Companies (Miscellaneous Amendments) Act 2019
Women's Charter (Amendment) Act 2019
Work Injury Compensation Act 2019

2020
Active Mobility (Amendment) Act 2020
Active Mobility (Amendment No. 2) Act 2020
Banking (Amendment) Act 2020
Building Control (Amendment) Act 2020
Constitution of the Republic of Singapore (Amendment) Act 2020
COVID-19 (Temporary Measures) Act 2020
COVID-19 (Temporary Measures for Solemnization and Registration of Marriages) Act 2020
Economic Expansion Incentives (Relief from Income Tax) (Amendment) Act 2020
Estate Agents (Amendment) Act 2020
Geographical Indications (Amendment) Act 2020
Goods and Services Tax Voucher Fund (Amendment) Act 2020
Hazardous Waste (Control of Export, Import and Transit) (Amendment) Act 2020
Healthcare Services Act 2020
High Court (Admiralty Jurisdiction) (Amendment) Act 2020
Hindu Endowments (Amendment) Act 2020
Merchant Shipping (Maritime Labour Convention) (Amendment) Act 2020
National Environment Agency (Amendment) Act 2020
Parliamentary Elections (COVID-19 Special Arrangements) Act 2020
Public Utilities (Amendment) Act 2020
Revised Supplementary Supply (FY 2020) Act 2020
Shared Mobility Enterprises (Control and Licensing) Act 2020
Singapore Convention on Mediation Act 2020
Small Motorised Vehicles (Safety) Act 2020
Statutes (Miscellaneous Amendments) Act 2020
Supplementary Supply (FY 2019) Act 2020
Supply Act 2020
Wild Animals and Birds (Amendment) Act 2020

References

.

Singapore
Singapore law-related lists
 List of Acts